Yashansakhi (also Romanized as Yashānsakhī and Yeshān Sakhī; also known as Majīd) is a village in Shoaybiyeh-ye Gharbi Rural District, Shadravan District, Shushtar County, Khuzestan Province, Iran. At the 2006 census, its population was 672, in 111 families.

References 

Populated places in Shushtar County